Peter Mlynarčík (born 29 November 1991) is a Slovak male volleyball player. He is part of the Slovakia men's national volleyball team. He competed at the 2015 European Games in Baku. On club level he plays for SK Aich-Dob.

References

1991 births
Living people
Slovak men's volleyball players
Volleyball players at the 2015 European Games
European Games competitors for Slovakia
Place of birth missing (living people)
Slovak expatriate sportspeople in Austria
Expatriate volleyball players in Austria